Duptiair Union is a union of Nagarpur Upazila, Tangail District, Bangladesh. It is situated 12 km south of Nagarpur and 36 km south of Tangail city.

Demographics

According to Population Census 2011 performed by Bangladesh Bureau of Statistics, The total population of Duptiair union is 26,336. There are 5,677 households in total.

Education

The literacy rate of Duptiair Union is 35.6% (Male-41.4%, Female-30.1%).

See also
 Union Councils of Tangail District

References

Populated places in Dhaka Division
Populated places in Tangail District
Unions of Nagarpur Upazila